The main ethnic minorities in Georgia are Azerbaijanis, Armenians, Ukrainians, Russians, Greeks, Abkhazians, Ossetians, Kists, Assyrians and Yazidi.

Ethnic minorities
According to the "National Integration and Tolerance in Georgia Assessment Survey Report" 2007–2008, implemented by the UN Association of Georgia and supported by USAID, the following ethnic groups are living in Georgia:

Historical background 

Georgia's ethnic composition varied from one historical epoch to another and this happened as the result of certain economic, political or social factors. Georgian academic Vakhtang Jaoshvili identified four major stages in the history of Georgia that influenced the ethnic composition of Georgia: from medieval times to the late 18th century; from the 19th century to the 1921 Soviet invasion of Georgia; from 1921 to the collapse of the USSR; and present days, starting with the Georgian declaration of independence.

As Georgia during medieval times remained the victim of military aggression coming from its neighbors, its territories near the borders were often abandoned by Georgians, and the vacated areas were occupied by other ethnic groups. In the 15th century Muslims populations moved to the Kvemo Kartli province. In this era, Ossetians also moved from Northern Caucasus, settling in Georgia. By the early 19th century Georgians made up only four-fifths of the total population.

In the beginning of the 19th century a big influx of foreign populations were deliberately settled in Georgia. In 1832 Georgians were 75.9 percent of total population in comparison to the 79,4 percent in 1800. This was determined by the Russian Empire establishing its rule over Georgia, replacing the Georgians populations near the borders with other ethnic groups because of economical or military interests. In the beginning of the 19th century Russia forced Muslim Georgians to move from Samtskhe-Javakheti to the Ottoman Empire, replacing them with Armenians who were encouraged by Russia to leave Iran and Turkey through the 1828 Treaty of Turkmenchay and the 1829 Treaty of Adrianople as signed respectively with the two. In 1830 the number of Armenians settlers reached 35,000. By 1830 18 Greek settlements appeared in Georgia as well. In addition Georgia also remained a potential place of residence for Russian demoralized soldiers and religious sects like Dukhobors. During World War I Kurds and Assyrians also settled in Georgia.

Under Soviet rule Georgia received a massive influx of immigrants, especially Ukrainians, Russians, Ossetians and Armenians. In addition, the increase of the birth rate among Jews, Azerbaijanis or other ethnic groups led to a significant decrease in ethnic Georgians and by 1939, for the first time in the history of Georgia, Georgians were less than two-thirds of the whole population. This decrease was contrasted by the emigration of Georgians, many of whom not ethnically Georgians, after the end of World War II. By 1979 the share of Georgians was 62.1 percent in urban areas and 75.7 percent in rural areas.
The collapse of the Soviet Union had a similar effect, causing emigration from Georgia, especially from war zones in Abkhazia and South Ossetia. Thus, ethnic minorities in 1989 constituted 30 percent of total population, and by 2002 this number had dropped to 16 percent.

Ethnic minorities in Georgia today 
Georgia is, to this day, ethnically diverse. The government worked out special plans for the integration of ethnic minorities into the society. In August 2005 the Georgian government established the Civil Integration and Tolerance Council. Its main function was to study the issue of tolerance towards ethnic minorities and their level of their participation to society. The council defined six main priority areas for the development of policies, and consequently created six working groups inside the council: Rule of Law; Education; Culture; Social and Regional Integration of Society; Media; Civic Participation;

Rule of law 
As a member of the international community Georgia has ratified several international agreements providing guarantees for ethnic minorities living on the territory of Georgia. Following is a list of such agreements, followed by the date of ratification by Georgia:

 Universal Declaration of Human Rights (15.09.1991)
 International Covenant on Civil and Political Rights (25.01.1994)
 International Covenant on Economic, Social and Cultural Rights (25.01.1994)
 International Convention Concerning discrimination in respect of Employment and Occupation (04.05.1995)
 European Cultural Convention (16.04.1997)
 International Convention on the Elimination of All Forms of Racial Discrimination (16.04.1999)
 Convention for The Protection of Human Rights and Fundamental Freedoms (12.05.1999)
 European Charter of Local Self-Government (16.10.2004)
 Framework Convention for the Protection of National Minorities (13.10.2005)
 European Outline Convention on Trans-frontier Co-operation between Territorial Communities or Authorities (04.11.2006)

The constitution of Georgia also recognizes the equal rights of every citizen regardless of race, colour, language, sex, religion, ethnic origin or nationality. Any violation of the equality of citizens is punishable under the Georgian law.

Education 
According to the Georgian Law on General Education every citizen of Georgia has a right on receiving secondary education in their native language if Georgian is not their native language. In addition it is also obligatory to teach state language in schools. As of 2008, the Georgian government funded:

 141 Armenian-language schools.
 117 Azerbaijani-language schools
 151 Russian-language schools
 3 Ossetian-language schools.
 161 bilingual schools
 6 trilingual schools

In order to provide equal opportunity for every citizen of Georgia to receive higher education in 2008, for the first time the national examination in general skills was conducted in Azerbaijani and Armenian languages as well.

In 2005 the Zurab Zhvania School of Public Administration was founded with the assistance of President and State in order to implement and promote democratic values in regional governmental and self-governmental institutions, and to improve the quality of social services and civil service. The school focuses on the preparation of civil servants and on the promotion of the teaching of Georgian language to ethnic minorities.

Social and regional integration of society 
The Georgian government identified the decrease of unemployment in the regions inhabited by ethnic minorities as fundamental to their integration in society. With this goal, it has economically promoted the local businesses. In total 6,941,500 GEL has been provided for such projects as re-equipment of wood processing, development of construction material producing, honey production, and so on, in the regions inhabited by ethnic minorities.

Media 
The Georgian Public Broadcasting (GPB) is the only media source legally obliged to broadcast in minority languages. On March 21, 2008 the Georgian parliament changed the Law on Broadcasting and GPB was obliged to spend at least 25% of its budget on programs related to South Ossetia and Abkhazia as well as on programs concerning ethnic minorities.

In order to allow ethnic minorities living in Georgia to be well informed about events taking place in the country the GPB news program "Moambe" is aired in different languages: Abkhazian, Ossetian, Russian, Armenian, Azerbaijani and Kurdish.
Since 2007 a 50-minute weekly radio bridge is held in conjunction with Baku and Yerevan.

Since June 2, 2007 the talk show Italian Yard has been aired on GPB. Its main aim is to promote dialogue among ethnic minorities living in Georgia and to encourage their successful integration into society. The show itself is conducted in Georgian and is designed for a wider audience. The format was designed with guidance of American journalist and producer Stan Matthews. The talk show crew acts according to the recommendations by GPB's minority council and considering the result of surveys carried out by the UN association of Georgia and other NGOs. The show crew frequently receives letters from ethnic minorities living in Samtskhe–Javakheti through the post boxes placed in the region. The project of Italian Yard is carried out with the assistance of USAID in the frames of National Integration and Tolerance in Georgia program of the United Nations Association of Georgia.

Civic participation 
Apart from participation in elections and to the decision-making process there also should be wider opportunities for civic participation that implies monitoring and consultation. An important step on this way was the memorandum signed on 26 June 2008 between the Civil Integration and Tolerance Council and the Ethnic Minorities Council within Ombudsman's Office.

List of the councils for the support and protection of ethnic minorities in Georgia 
 Council functioning under Patriarchate, founded on 20 June 2005. It consists of representatives of Eastern Orthodox, Catholic, Armenian Apostolic, Evangelical Lutheran and Evangelical Baptist churches as well as Jews and Muslim clerics.
 Religious Council functioning under the Ombudsman: Founded on 21 June 21, 2005, it consists of representatives of 23 religious groups.
 Ethnic Minorities Council under the Public Defender of Georgia: More than 80 NGOs are united under this council and are working together on solving diverse issues concerning ethnic minorities.
 Council functioning under Georgian Public Broadcasting: The council was created under the GPB and deals with issues concerning ethnic minorities, gender equality, religious issues etc. The council creates and presents recommendations to GPB concerning program priorities.

Organizations working on the protection of ethnic minorities in Georgia 
 European Centre for Minority Issues (ECMI), founded in 1996 in Germany, is an international organization working in the field of minority governance and conflict resolution. Through action-oriented projects, practice and policy-oriented research, information gathering and documentation, and advisory services, ECMI advances majority-minority relations throughout Europe and its neighbourhood. With its headquarters in Flensburg, Germany – together with its two regional offices based in Tbilisi, Georgia and Priština, Kosovo – ECMI contributes to the strengthening of legislation and best practices in minority governance. Correspondingly, ECMI enhances the capacity of civil society and governments to encourage constructive relations between minorities and states. ECMI has been operating a Caucasus office based in Tbilisi since 2003.
 UN Association of Georgia: The United Association of Georgia (UNAG) is a non-governmental organization founded on 25 December 1995. It works on the promotion of the development of civil participation and democratic governance, to provide Georgian society with the necessary skills for successful integration into the international community. UNAG has been the member of World Federation of United Nations Associations since 1996. UN Association of Georgia in partnership with Georgian government and financial support of USAID implemented the four-year program National Integration and Tolerance in Georgia (NITG) to promote an increased sense of unity among citizens of Georgian through supporting government of Georgia in formation of national integration strategy and action plan.
 Caucasus Institute for Peace, Democracy and Development: the CIPDD is an organization that encompasses wide spheres of activities connected with development of democracy in Georgia. Following projects has been implemented by CIPDD: Independent Media in South Caucasus, Supporting Ethnic Minorities for Democratic Political Participation, Improving Environment for ethnic minority integration in Georgia through supporting Reforms in the school education system.
 ALPE Foundation: is an independent non-governmental organization that pursues professional communication activities aimed at strengthening civil society in Georgia. One of the projects implemented by ALPE is "Fostering Integration through Education and Culture of Tolerance".
 Open Society Georgia Foundation: Based on its priorities the Open Society Georgia Foundation (OSGF) offers grants to non-profit, non-governmental organizations or individuals in order to promote the values of an open society in Georgia.
 Liberty Institute: The Liberty Institute is a non-profit, non-partisan organization promoting liberal public policy advocacy. Working in the spheres of freedom of speech, religion etc.
 Civic Integration Foundation: Civic Integration Foundation (CIF) is a non-governmental, non-profit and non-political organization committed to promotion of civic participation, human rights and civic integration. The main goal of CIF is to assist ethnic minorities integration into society. Among projects implemented by CIF following can be mentioned: Independent Media for Civil Integration; Supporting Ethnic Minorities for Democratic Political Participation; Legal Education as a Way for Successful Integration of National Minorities.

References

External links 
UN Association of Georgia Official Website
Caucasus Institute for Peace, Democracy and Development
ALPE Foundation 
Open Society Georgia Foundation
Liberty Institute
Civic Integration Foundation

 
Georgia